The Bot River klipfish (Clinus spatulatus) is a species of clinid endemic to South Africa where it is found in brackish waters of the Bot River and the Kleinmond Estuary where it lives amongst weeds.  This species can reach a length of  TL.

References

Bot river klipfish
Freshwater fish of South Africa
Taxonomy articles created by Polbot
Fish described in 1983